OCM Bocas Prize for Caribbean Literature, inaugurated in 2011 by the NGC Bocas Lit Fest, is an annual literary award for books by Caribbean writers published in the previous year. It is the only prize in the region that is open to works of different literary genres by writers of Caribbean birth or citizenship.

The prize award is US$10,000 and is sponsored by One Caribbean Media.  The shortlisted nominees are awarded $3,000.  Books may be entered in three categories: poetry, fiction, and literary non-fiction. The judges select the best book in each genre category, which three books form the shortlist for the prize, from which the overall winner is then chosen. The overall winner of the prize is announced at the NGC Bocas Lit Fest in Port of Spain, Trinidad and Tobago.

Winners and shortlisted nominees

Notes

External links
 The OCM Bocas Prize for Caribbean Literature official website.

Awards established in 2011
Fiction awards
Non-fiction literary awards
Poetry awards
Trinidad and Tobago literary awards
2011 establishments in North America
English-language literary awards